Seddik Berradja (born September 9, 1983 in Oran) is an Algerian football player. He currently plays for MC Oran in the Algerian Ligue Professionnelle 1.

Honours
 Won the Algerian Cup once with CR Belouizdad in 2009

External links
 DZFoot Profile
 

1983 births
Living people
Footballers from Oran
Algerian footballers
Algerian Ligue Professionnelle 1 players
CR Belouizdad players
MC Oran players
MC Alger players
Association football midfielders
21st-century Algerian people